Tilen Debelak (born 31 May 1991) is a Slovenian alpine ski racer.

References

External links

1991 births
Living people
Slovenian male alpine skiers
Place of birth missing (living people)
21st-century Slovenian people